Chenaran (also Romanized as Chenārān, Chanārān, and Shenārān) is a city in the Central District of Bojnord County, North Khorasan Province, Iran. At the 2006 census, its population was 3,658, in 856 families.

References 

Populated places in Bojnord County
Cities in North Khorasan Province